These are the Billboard magazine Hot 100 number one hits of 1967.

That year, 8 acts hit number one for the first time, such as The Buckinghams, The Turtles, Aretha Franklin, The Doors, Bobbie Gentry, The Box Tops, Lulu, and Strawberry Alarm Clock. The Supremes, The Monkees, and The Beatles were the only acts to have more than one song hit number one that year, with The Beatles having the most with three, while The Supremes and The Monkees have two.

Chart history

Number-one artists

See also
1967 in music
List of Billboard number-one singles
Cashbox Top 100 number-one singles of 1967

Sources
Fred Bronson's Billboard Book of Number 1 Hits, 5th Edition
Joel Whitburn's Top Pop Singles 1955-2008, 12 Edition
Joel Whitburn Presents the Billboard Hot 100 Charts: The Sixties
Additional information obtained can be verified within Billboard's online archive services and print editions of the magazine.

References

1967 record charts
1967